The year 1986 in archaeology involved some significant events.

Explorations

Excavations
 Foundations of the Colossus of Nero in Rome.
 British Supermarine Spitfire Mark 1a fighter aircraft N3200 recovered from the beach at Sangatte in France.

Finds
 July 18 - First sacrificial pit at Sanxingdui in China found, leading to extensive investigation of the site.
 La Mojarra Stela 1.
 The second half of the Rogozen Treasure is found by archaeologists from the museum in Vratsa, Bulgaria.
 A fragment of Livy's Ab Urbe Condita Libri is found in Egypt.

Publications
 John McK. Camp - The Athenian Agora: excavations in the heart of classical Athens. London: Thames and Hudson. 
 Abraham de la Pryme (1672–1704) - A History of Kingston upon Hull. Kingston upon Hull City Council and Malet Lambert High School. 
 Pramod B. Gadre - Cultural Archaeology of Ahmadnagar during Nizam Shahi period, 1494–1632. Delhi: B.R. Publishing Corporation.
 Arlene Miller Rosen - Cities of Clay: the geoarcheology of tells. University of Chicago Press. 
 Henrieta Todorova (Хенриета Тодорова) - Каменно -медната епоха в България ("The Eneolithic period in Bulgaria"). Sofia.

Events
 July 8 - Protection of Military Remains Act passed in the United Kingdom.
 November - First UNESCO World Heritage Sites in Great Britain designated: Durham Castle and Cathedral; Ironbridge Gorge; Studley Royal Park (including the ruins of Fountains Abbey); Stonehenge, Avebury and Associated Sites; and Castles and Town Walls of King Edward in Gwynedd (Wales).

Births

Deaths
 January 10 - Emil Forrer, Swiss Assyriologist and Hittitologist (b. 1894)
 December 13 - Glyn Daniel, Welsh-born archaeologist (b. 1914)

References

Archaeology
Archaeology
Archaeology by year
Archaeology, 1986 In